Livingston Municipal Airport may refer to:

 Livingston Municipal Airport (Tennessee) in Livingston, Tennessee, United States (FAA: 8A3)
 Livingston Municipal Airport (Texas) in Livingston, Texas, United States (FAA: 00R)